Viola Odebrecht (born 11 February 1983) is a retired German footballer who last played for VfL Wolfsburg. She also played for Germany.

Club career

1. FFC Turbine Potsdam
In 2005 Odebrecht won the UEFA Women's Cup with 1.FFC Turbine Potsdam, the team for which she signed again for the 2008/09 season.

In the 2006 summer season, Odebrecht played five times for Valur in the Icelandic Úrvalsdeild, scoring once.

VfL Wolfsburg
On 29 February 2012, Odebrecht signed a two-year contract and will move to VfL Wolfsburg on 1 July 2012.

She retired after the 2014–15 season.

International career
In 2003, she was a member of the World Cup winning team who went on to take the bronze medal at the Athens Olympics 2004.

After a six-year hiatus, Odebrecht returned to the German national side in a Euro 2013 qualifying match against Romania on 22 October 2011.

International goals
Scores and results list Germany's goal tally first:

Personal life
Odebrecht was part of a rotation of studio commentators for ESPN's telecasts of the 2011 FIFA Women's World Cup.

References

External links
Viola Odebrecht at dfb.de

1983 births
Living people
German women's footballers
Germany women's international footballers
1. FFC Turbine Potsdam players
SC 07 Bad Neuenahr players
FCR 2001 Duisburg players
VfL Wolfsburg (women) players
Footballers at the 2004 Summer Olympics
Olympic bronze medalists for Germany
People from Neubrandenburg
Expatriate women's footballers in Iceland
German expatriates in Iceland
Olympic medalists in football
2003 FIFA Women's World Cup players
Medalists at the 2004 Summer Olympics
FIFA Women's World Cup-winning players
Women's association football midfielders
Florida State Seminoles women's soccer players
Olympic footballers of Germany
Footballers from Mecklenburg-Western Pomerania